Folk Song 2: Utahime Aishouka (フォーク・ソング2 〜歌姫哀翔歌) is the cover album by Japanese singer Akina Nakamori. Although the original release was scheduled on 22 July, it was postponed one week on 29 July 2009 under the Universal Music Japan. It's Nakamori's seventh cover album.

Yuuji Toriyama reprised his role as a main producer and sound producer of the album. The album was released in the limited and regular edition. The limited edition includes DVD disc with recording footage of the album.  The album consists of folk songs that were released in Japan during 1970s.

Stage performances
In 2009, Nakamori performed Gakuseigai no Kissaten, Tabi no Yado, Kokoro Moyou, Shikuramen no Hakori, Akujo, I love you and Velvet Easter in the special live Akina Nakamori Special Live 2009 “Empress at Yokohama”. The DVD footage was released on 8 August 2010.

Chart performance
Folk Song: Utahime Jojouka debuted at number 33 on the Oricon Album Weekly Chart, charted for 6 weeks and sold over 8,100 copies.

Track listing

References

2009 albums
Japanese-language albums
Akina Nakamori albums
Universal Music Japan albums